Pathet Lao is a weekly newspaper published in Laos.

See also
List of newspapers in Laos

Newspapers published in Laos